Tonka (also TONKA-250 and R-Stoff) is the name given to a German-designed rocket propellant first used in the Wasserfall missile, and recently used by North Korea. It was used in the Soviet Union under the name TG-02, for example in the engine designs of the A.M. Isayev Chemical Engineering Design Bureau.

Its name is a reference to the tonka bean. Being invented during the Second World War, it has no connection to the similarly named toys.

The Soviet Union reverse-engineered the Wasserfall missile and investigated the use of hypergolic propellants for the eventually abandoned Burya ICBM project. It put TG-02/AK-2x fuelled engines into service with the Kh-22 cruise missile and the S5.4 de-orbit engine used on the Vostok and Voskhod spacecraft and the Zenit satellite.

The most globalized use of Tonka is as an igniter in many Soviet Scud missile variants and its descendants, such as the North Korean Nodong, which are principally propelled by nitric acid and kerosene (TM-185). This combination is not hypergolic so needs an ignition source, supplied by a system that injects a few kilograms of Tonka fuel when ignition is desired.

Triethylamine/xylidine mixtures composed the TX and TX2 fuels of the French SEPR rocket engines of the 1950s, used for auxiliary rocket power in the Mirage IIIC. In aircraft use, TX fuels were later replaced by non-toxic kerosene jet fuels, simplifying fuelling of the aircraft. Little change was required to the engines but as this was no longer hypergolic with nitric acid, a small tank of TX was retained for ignition.

The use of Tonka by amateurs is not advised, because the exact proportions of ingredients necessary for the mixture to work as desired, rather than fail catastrophically, is a function both of the purity of the ingredients and their temperature during use.

See also
 Furfuryl alcohol - also hypergolic with nitric acid but lower performance
 Unsymmetrical dimethylhydrazine - a higher performance substance that replaced Tonka/TG-02 as a fuel for Soviet spacecraft.

References

Rocket fuels
German inventions of the Nazi period